František Gödri is a Paralympic athlete from Slovakia competing mainly in category P12 pentathlon events.

Biography
He competed in the 1992 Summer Paralympics in Barcelona, Spain.  There he went out in the first round of the men's 100 metres - B2 event, finished fifth in the men's 200 metres - B2 event, went out in the first round of the men's 400 metres - B2 event and a bronze medal in the men's Pentathlon - B2 event.  He competed in the 1996 Summer Paralympics in Atlanta, United States. There he won a bronze medal in the men's Pentathlon - P11 event and finished eleventh in the men's Long jump - F11 event.  He also competed at the 2000 Summer Paralympics in Sydney, Australia but did not finish in  the men's Pentathlon - P12 event.

Footnotes

References
 

Year of birth missing (living people)
Living people
Paralympic athletes of Czechoslovakia
Paralympic athletes of Slovakia
Athletes (track and field) at the 1992 Summer Paralympics
Athletes (track and field) at the 1996 Summer Paralympics
Athletes (track and field) at the 2000 Summer Paralympics
Paralympic bronze medalists for Czechoslovakia
Paralympic bronze medalists for Slovakia
Medalists at the 1992 Summer Paralympics
Medalists at the 1996 Summer Paralympics
Paralympic medalists in athletics (track and field)